Tubay, officially the Municipality of Tubay,  is a 4th class municipality in the province of Agusan del Norte, Philippines. According to the 2020 census, it has a population of 25,785 people.

It was created from the barrios of Tubay, La Fraternidad, Tinigbasan, Cabayawa, Victory, Santa Ana, and Tagmamarcay of the municipality of Cabadbaran in 1947, through Republic Act No. 188.

History

The town of Tubay is named after its legendary founder Datu Tabay, and lays claim to being the second Spanish Settlement in Agusan and was known as a pueblo as early as 1751. Formerly, the people settled in the wilderness of Ilihan, then transferred to sitio Malabog and later to Tubay-Tubay and Sabang near the mouth of the Jabonga River. However, the danger of constant inundation and Moro attacks convinced the succeeding leader of the place to move the pueblo to Daang Lungsod where the massive magkuno post of once spacious and strongly built church now stand. It was here where the settlement firmly took place.

Since 1898, Tubay was a prosperous town. But when the Americans visited Tubay and Cabadbaran, they were convinced that the latter was the better place for the seat of government. Therefore, in 1903, Tubay was reduced to a barrio to give way to its equally thriving neighbor, Cabadbaran. Although reduced to a barrio status, it still remained the center of commercial activity due to the presence of Chinese merchants. Booming business in Tubay was still noticeable until the fabulous 20's when the navigable Jabonga River was the chief artery of its copra and hemp traffic. However, when the road connecting Tubay-Santiago and Cabadbaran was finished, business in Tubay began to decline and trade through the Jabonga River disappeared.

On June 22, 1947, Tubay officially became a municipality when the Congress of the Philippines enacted Republic Act No. 188 which separated the barrios of Tubay, La Fraternidad, Tinigbasan, Cabayawa, Victory, Santa Ana, and Tagmamarcay, all from Cabadbaran, and constituted into the newly created town. By virtue of said law, President Manuel Roxas issued Presidential Proclamation No. 44 on October 20, 1947, thus making Tubay regain its township status.

Geography
According to the Philippine Statistics Authority, the municipality has a land area of  constituting  of the  total area of Agusan del Norte.

Climate

Barangays
Tubay is politically subdivided into 13 barangays.

Demographics

In the 2020 census, Tubay had a population of 25,785.

Economy

References

External links

 [ Philippine Standard Geographic Code]
 
 Presidential Proclamation No. 44

Municipalities of Agusan del Norte